"Guess Things Happen That Way" is a 1958 cross over single by Johnny Cash, which was written by Jack Clement.  The single was Johnny Cash's fourth #1 on the country chart spending eight weeks at #1, and a total of 24 weeks on the chart.

The B-side of "Guess Things Happen That Way", a song entitled, "Come In Stranger" made it to #6 on the country chart. The single also crossed over to the pop chart, peaking at #66. The song was also featured in the 1993 film A Perfect World directed by Clint Eastwood and was put on the film's soundtrack.

Content
The song is about a man struggling after the love of his life has died.

Critical reception
As Allmusic describes it, the song "featured an arrangement dominated by piano and a vocal chorus adding distinctive 'ba-doo's throughout [that is] ...slicker than, say, "Cry! Cry! Cry!" or "I Walk the Line" [but with] an eccentric tone all its own — largely because the vocal chorus (who sound as if they're occupying a middle ground between doo wop and barbershop quartet) is in such stark contrast to Cash's lead vocal."

The song was banned by the BBC upon its 1958 release when the head of religious broadcasting objected to the lines "God gave me that girl to lean on, / Then he put me on my own. / Heaven help me be a man / And have the strength to stand alone."

Chart performance

Covers
Emmylou Harris and the Nash Ramblers on At the Ryman
Pop singer June Valli had a minor revival of the song in 1961. Her version peaked at #92 in the Music Vendor Top 100.

In popular culture
On February 25, 2010, the song, purchased by grandfather and Woodstock, Georgia native Louie Sulcer, became the 10 billionth download through the Apple iTunes Store.

References

Johnny Cash songs
1958 singles
Rock-and-roll songs
Songs written by Jack Clement
Song recordings produced by Jack Clement
Song recordings produced by Sam Phillips
Sun Records singles
1958 songs
Songs banned by the BBC